Lin Mei-chu is a Taiwanese politician. She was the Minister of Labor from 8 February 2017 until 22 February 2018.

Education
Lin obtained her bachelor's and master's degrees in law from National Chengchi University in 1976 and 1982, respectively.

Political career

She was appointed to head the Mongolian and Tibetan Affairs Commission in April 2016. Lin stated in June, shortly after taking office on 20 May 2016, that she preferred handing over the MTAC's functions to other government agencies.

In February 2017, she replaced Kuo Fang-yu as minister of labor. On 22 February 2018, she tendered her resignation from the ministry, citing health reasons. She was replaced by Deputy Minister Su Li-chiung.

Lin was named chair of the Taiwan Asset Management Corporation on 13 December 2018. The next day, she announced her resignation.

Personal
Lin and ROC President Tsai Ing-wen are cousins.

References

1953 births
Living people
Politicians of the Republic of China on Taiwan from Taipei
Taiwanese Ministers of Labor
Women government ministers of Taiwan